Georges André Sentenac (born 4 May 1939) is a French molecular biologist specializing in gene transcription.

Married to Pierrette Balse, professor of mathematics at the University of Orsay, they had three children, all scientists, Anne, Marion and Daniel.

Biography 
He was elected correspondent of the French Academy of sciences in 1999 and then a member of the Institute in 2007.

Scientific career 
During his postdoctoral internship in Dr. George Acs' laboratory in New York City, Sentenac addresses the regulation of gene expression by showing that appropriate hormonal treatment forces a young male cockerel to produce certain specific components of the egg. Back in France, to bypass the complexity of higher organisms, he chose to work on the yeast Saccharomyces cerevisiae. In the following years, this yeast will become an essential study model in the molecular genetics of eukaryotic cells.

First, he isolated and identified the essential components of the molecular machinery responsible for gene transcription in yeast. He gave the first complete description of the three forms of nuclear RNA polymerases which are composed of the assembly of many subunits with various functions. Focusing his efforts on the transcription of the large family of class III genes encoding tRNAs, 5S RNA and other small RNAs, he isolated the general transcription factors TFIIIC and TFIIIB and described the cascade of protein-DNA and protein-protein interaction leading to the recruitment of RNA polymerase III on DNA and the initiation of transcription. A total of 26 proteins are dedicated to the transcription of class III genes. In particular, it shows that the TFIIIC factor consists of two protein modules capable of binding to two distinct promoter elements spaced differently according to genes, of lifting chromatin repression and of recruiting TFIIIB.

Awards and honours 
1969, Maurice Nicloux Prize of the French Society of Biochemistry
1977, Paul Doisteau-Emile Blutel Prize from the Academy of Sciences
1985, Elected Member of EMBO
1987, CNRS Silver Medal
1997, Charles-Léopold Mayer Grand Prize of the French Academy of sciences
1999, Member of the Academia Europaea
1999, Correspondent of the French Academy of sciences
1999-2004, Member of the EMBO Council
2007, Member of the French Academy of sciences
2012, Commander in the Ordre des Palmes Académiques
2018, Officer in the Ordre de la Légion d'Honneur

More representative publications 
Sentenac, A. Eukaryotic RNA polymerases. CRC Crit. Rev. Biochem. (1985) 18: 31-90
Marzouki, N., CaMier, S., Ruet, A, Moenne, A, and  Sentenac, A. Selective proteolysis defines two DNA binding domains in yeast transcription factor τ. Nature (1986) 323: 176-178
Margottin, F., Dujardin, G., Gérard, M., Égly, J.-M., Huet, J. and Sentenac, A.  Participation of the TATA factor in transcription of the yeast U6 gene by RNA polymerase C. Science (1991) 251: 424-426
Burnol, A-F., Margottin, F., Huet, J., Almouzni, G., Prioleau, M.-N., Méchali, M., and Sentenac, A. TFIIIC relieves repression of U6 snRNA transcription by chromatin. Nature (1993) 62: 475-477
Marsolier, M.-C., Tanaka, S., Livingstone-Zatchej, M., Grunstein, M., Thoma, F. and Sentenac, A. Reciprocal interferences between nucleosomal organization and transcriptional activity of the yeast SNR6 gene. Genes & Dev. (1995) 9: 410-422
Rüth, J., Conesa, C., Dieci, G., Lefebvre, O., Düsterhöft, A, Ottonello,  S., and Sentenac, A. A suppressor of mutations in the class III transcription system encodes a component of yeast TFIIIB. EMBO J. (1996) 15: 1941-1949
Dieci, G. and Sentenac, A. Facilitated recycling pathway for RNA polymerase III. Cell (1996) 84: 245-252
Chédin, S., Ferri, M.L., Peyroche, G., Andrau, J.C., Jourdain, S., Lefebvre, O., Werner, M., CarLes, C., and Sentenac, A. The yeast RNA polymerase III transcription machinery: a paradigm for eukaryotic gene activation. Cold Spring Harb. Symp. Quant. Biol. (1998) 63: 381-389
Oficjalska-Pham, D., Harismendy, O., Smagowicz, W.J., Gonzalez de Peredo, A, Boguta, M., Sentenac, A. and Lefebvre, O. General repression of RNA polymerase III transcription is triggered by protein phosphatase type 2A-mediated dephosphorylation of Maf1 Mol. Cell (2006) 22: 623-632.
Ducrot, C., Lefebvre, O., Landrieux, E., Guirouilh-Barbat, J., Sentenac, A. and Acker, J. Reconstitution of the yeast RNA polymerase III transcription system with all recombinant factors. J. Biol. Chem. (2006) 281: 11685-11692
Sentenac, A. and Riva, M. Odd RNA polymerases or the A(B)C of eukaryotic transcription. Biochim. Biophys. Acta (2013) 1829 : 251-257

Main books 
Sentenac, A. and Hall, B. Yeast RNA polymerases and their role in transcription in The Molecular Biology of the Yeast Saccharomyces. Cold Spring Harbor Laboratory Press (1982) pp 561–606
Thuriaux, P. and Sentenac, A.Yeast nuclear RNA Polymerases in The Molecular and Cellular Biology of the Yeast Saccharomyces : Gene expression. Cold Spring Harbor Laboratory Press (1991) pp 1–48

References

1939 births
French molecular biologists
Members of the French Academy of Sciences
Living people